Dioptis meon is a moth of the family Notodontidae first described by Pieter Cramer in 1775. It is found in Guyana and Suriname.

References

Moths described in 1775
Notodontidae of South America
Taxa named by Pieter Cramer